The Troieshchyna Cathedral is one of the largest Ukrainian Orthodox churches in Kyiv. It was built on the outskirts of Kyiv, in the former village of Troieshchyna, between 1991 and 1997. The penticupolar church is dedicated to the Holy Trinity. A huge bell tower stands nearby. The style is that of a traditional Ukrainian Baroque cathedral.

Eastern Orthodox cathedrals in Ukraine
Cathedrals in Kyiv
Ukrainian Orthodox Church (Moscow Patriarchate) cathedrals
Churches completed in 1997